Jihad Al-Atrash (28 August 1943) is a Lebanese actor and voice actor.

Filmography

Film 
The Lebanon I Dream Of - Himself. 2009
Tuff Incident - Imam Husayn voice. 2007
Alebaa Procession - Imam Husayn ibn Ali voice. 2005

Television 
Ajyal - Raif. 2010
Cello - Narrator. 2015

Plays 
The Knight. 2016

Dubbing roles 
 Around the World with Willy Fog - Willy Fog
 Arrow Emblem: Hawk of the Grand Prix - Takaya Todoroki
 Manga Aesop Monogatari
 Manga Hajimete Monogatari
 Manga Sarutobi Sasuke
 The Many Dream Journeys of Meme
 The Men of Angelos
 Nobody's Boy: Remi - Driscoll
 Pokémon - Narrator
 Saint Mary - Zechariah
 Serendipity the Pink Dragon
 UFO Robot Grendizer - Duke Fleed/Daisuke Umon

Awards

References

External links 

1943 births
Lebanese male actors
Lebanese male voice actors
Living people
20th-century Lebanese male actors
21st-century Lebanese male actors
Jihad
Lebanese male television actors